Motexafin gadolinium (proposed tradename Xcytrin) is an inhibitor of thioredoxin reductase and ribonucleotide reductase. It has been proposed as a possible chemotherapeutic agent in the treatment of brain metastases.

History
On May 9, 2006, a New Drug Application was submitted to the United States Food and Drug Administration (FDA) by Pharmacyclics, Inc.

In December 2007, the FDA issued a not approvable letter for motexafin gadolinium.

References

Organogadolinium compounds